Petals for Armor II is the second extended play (EP) by American singer-songwriter and Paramore frontwoman Hayley Williams. It was released on Atlantic Records on April 21, 2020, as the second in a series of releases in the Petals for Armor era. Williams explained the inspiration behind its title is due to her belief that "the best way for me to protect myself is to be vulnerable."

Petals for Armor II was produced by Williams' Paramore bandmate Taylor York and was written throughout 2019 during Paramore's hiatus after touring in support of their fifth studio album, After Laughter (2017). The lead single, "Roses/Lotus/Violet/Iris", was released on March 19, 2020.

Background
Following extensive touring in support of Paramore's fifth studio album After Laughter (2017), Hayley Williams expressed her feelings about the group's future moving forward explaining that they were not breaking up, however needed time away from writing and touring. In an interview with BBC Radio, in January 2020, Williams explained her process behind developing Petals for Armor.

Singles
"Roses/Lotus/Violet/Iris" was released to digital download and streaming platforms as the lead single on March 19, 2020.

Track listing

Credits and personnel

Musicians
 Hayley Williams – primary artist, lead vocals, keyboards, guitar
 Taylor York – production, additional instrumentation
 Joey Howard – bass guitar, keyboards
 Aaron Steele – drums, percussion, congas
 Benjamin Kaufman – violin, chin cello

Additional personnel
 Daniel James – string arrangements, additional production
 Julien Baker – background vocals
 Phoebe Bridgers – background vocals
 Lucy Dacus – background vocals
 Carlos de la Garza – mixing engineer
 Dave Cooley – mastering engineer
 Kevin "K-Bo" Boettger – assistant engineer
 Michael Craver – assistant engineer, assistant mixing engineer
 David Fitzgibbons – assistant engineer, assistant mixing engineer
 Michelle Freetly – assistant engineer
 Jake Butler – assistant engineer

References

2020 EPs
Atlantic Records EPs
Hayley Williams albums
Albums produced by Taylor York